The Elegant Gentleman's Guide to Knife Fighting was a six-part sketch comedy series produced by Australian production house Jungleboys. It first aired in Australia on ABC TV on 3 April 2013.

See also
 List of Australian television series

References

External links
"Laughs at knife-point"
Elegant Gentlemen take sketch comedy to the sharp end
The Elegant Gentleman’s Guide to Knife Fighting molkstvtalk.com

Australian Broadcasting Corporation original programming
Australian satirical television shows
2013 Australian television series debuts
2013 Australian television series endings
English-language television shows
Australian television sketch shows